The 2021 Cary Challenger II was a professional tennis tournament being played on hard courts. It was the 8th edition of the tournament which was part of the 2021 ATP Challenger Tour. It took place in Cary, North Carolina, United States between 13 and 19 September 2021.

Singles main-draw entrants

Seeds

 1 Rankings are as of August 30, 2021.

Other entrants
The following players received wildcards into the singles main draw:
  Garrett Johns
  Luca Stäheli
  Zachary Svajda

The following players received entry from the qualifying draw:
  Rinky Hijikata
  Aleksandar Kovacevic
  Shintaro Mochizuki
  Alexander Sarkissian

Champions

Singles

  Mitchell Krueger def.  Bjorn Fratangelo 6–4, 6–3.

Doubles

  William Blumberg /  Max Schnur def.  Stefan Kozlov /  Peter Polansky 6–4, 1–6, [10–4].

References

2021 ATP Challenger Tour
2021
2021 in American tennis
September 2021 sports events in the United States